"Burn the Ships" is a song performed by an Australian Christian pop duo For King & Country. The song impacted Christian radio in the United States on 30 August 2018, becoming the third single from Burn the Ships (2018). The song was written by Matt Hales, Seth Mosley, Joel Smallbone and Luke Smallbone.

The song peaked at No. 3 on the US Hot Christian Songs chart, becoming their eleventh top ten single.

Background 
"Burn the Ships" was initially availed on 28 September 2018 as the fifth promotional single from Burn the Ships (2018). In an interview with Billboard, the duo shared the inspiration of the song, saying that it came from Luke Smallbone's wife, Courtney, battling with an addiction to prescribed medication, combined with an historical incident during the Spanish conquest of Mexico in 1519 AD, where a Spanish commander named Hernán Cortés, landed his ships on enemy shores unaware of what awaited his arrival. To ensure that the men were committed to their mission, he proclaimed, "Burn the ships!" Luke Smallbone shared in an interview with NewReleaseToday that the song became the album's title track after realising that the theme of "no retreat" was recurring on the album especially in songs like "Never Give Up" and "Fight On, Fighter" and he opined that "it makes the album and the title feel potent."

The song was released to Christian radio in the United States on 30 August 2019, becoming Burn the Ships''' third official single. A radio-adapted version of the song was released in digital format on 27 September 2019. On 4 October 2019, For King & Country released a remix of the song by R3hab.

 Composition 
"Burn the Ships" composed in the key of F major with a tempo of 94 beats per minute. For King & Country's vocal range spans from C3 to C5.

 Commercial performance 
The song reached No. 1 on Billboard's Christian Airplay chart. It has sold 32,000 copies in the United States as of November 2019.

 Music video 
The music video of "Burn the Ships" was published on For King & Country's YouTube channel on 5 October 2018, celebrating the release of the album which arrived on the same day. It was filmed on Lady Washington'', the duo singing aboard the ship before leaving an explosive and retreating to shore.

Accolades

Track listing

Charts

Weekly charts

Year-end charts

Certifications

Release history

References 

2018 singles
2019 songs
For King & Country (band) songs
Contemporary Christian songs
Songs written by Aqualung (musician)
Songs written by Seth Mosley
Songs written by Joel Smallbone